Norton 360, developed by Gen Digital Inc. (formerly Symantec), is an “all-in-one” security suite for the consumer market. Originally released in 2007, it was discontinued in 2014; its features were carried over to its successor, Norton Security.

In 2019, Symantec (under former corporate name NortonLifeLock) released a "NEW Norton 360", as a product replacement for Norton Security.

Version history

Project Genesis

Symantec announced Project Genesis on February 7, 2006. Genesis would differ from Symantec's other consumer security products by incorporating file backup and performance optimization tools with antivirus capabilities and a firewall. Phishing protection and real-time heuristics were also planned. Windows Vista compatibility was a major aspect of Genesis. Genesis was slated for release in September. In May 2005, Microsoft announced Windows Live OneCare, a security suite with similar functionalities, slated for release in 2006.

Genesis was renamed Norton 360 on May 31, 2006. Its feature set was confirmed—it would have the same functionalities as Norton Internet Security—with file backup, performance tools, phishing protection, and real-time heuristics. A public beta test was planned for summer 2006. The final release date was set at the end of 2006. The same day, McAfee announced Falcon, a security suite with similar functionalities as Norton 360 and OneCare. However, those dates were delayed. OneCare was launched in summer 2006 while Falcon entered public beta testing.

Some viewed Norton 360 as a response to Microsoft's antivirus software, OneCare. However, with the release of OneCare, some saw Symantec as lagging behind its rivals. Mark Bregman, Symantec's vice president, claimed the upcoming Norton 360 was not intended to compete with OneCare, stating "We somehow left the wrong impression in the market place that there's Windows Live OneCare from Microsoft, there's Falcon from McAfee, and there's nothing from Symantec."

The first public beta was delivered in November 2006, compatible with Windows XP. A second beta was subsequently released December 20, 2006, adding compatibility for Windows Vista build 6000. After 100,000 people tested the software, Symantec began distribution to retailers in February 2007.

Version 1.0

Version 1.0 was released on February 26, 2007. This version was the first Symantec product to use SONAR to detect zero-day viruses. It monitors applications for malicious behavior, taking action as needed. The backup and restore functionality allowed users to back up files online or to a hard drive, CD, or DVD. Performance optimization tools allowed users to clear web browser history and temporary files. A disk defragmenter was bundled as part of the optimization tools. Phishing protection integrates with Internet Explorer, warning users of fraudulent sites.

In Windows XP, a 300 megahertz processor, 256 megabytes of RAM, and 300 MB of hard disk space is required. Under Vista, an 800 MHz processor, 512 MB of RAM, and 300 MB of hard disk space is required.

Reviews cited Norton 360's low resource usage, relative to Norton Internet Security 2007, and phishing protection. PC Magazine found the phishing protection feature to be more effective at blocking access to fraudulent sites than Internet Explorer 7 and Firefox 2. However, reviewers highlighted the lack of manual control for advanced users. CNET noted the lack of phishing protection for browsers other than Internet Explorer, such as Mozilla Firefox. CNET also highlighted the lack of wireless network tools, such as notifying users when someone uninvited joins the network or help encrypting wireless signals. PC Magazine criticized the antispam filter of Version 1.0, finding it blocked only half of the spam mail, and with five percent false positive rate.

Version 2.0
Version 2.0 was released March 3, 2008. The backup feature can now inscribe data to Blu-ray and HD DVD discs. Multiple installations of Norton 360 can also be managed from a centralized location. When backing up files online, the user can control the amount of bandwidth Norton uses. A registry cleaner is bundled with the performance tools, allowing the user to remove invalid entries. Phishing protection for Firefox was added. Supplementing the phishing protection is the Norton Identity Safe, which stores login credentials to websites. A network map allows users to view the status of other Norton installations on networked computers and view basic information about each computer. System requirements remain the same as version 1.0.

PC Magazine found the spam filter to be inaccurate, with a 25 percent false positive rate. CNET encountered problems when installing version 2.0 on legacy machines.

Version 3.0

Version 3.0 was released on March 4, 2009. This version uses the same codebase as Norton Internet Security 2009. For earlier versions, Symantec rewrote code specifically for Norton 360.

Version 3.0 incorporates Norton Safe Web, offered as a standalone service earlier. Safe Web integrates with Firefox and Internet Explorer as a toolbar, blocking access to fraudulent and malware hosting sites. This toolbar also includes a search box, routing search queries typed in the box through the Ask.com search engine. The toolbar does not share code with the Ask.com toolbar, which was classified as spyware by McAfee, Trend Micro, and other antivirus vendors. Due to criticism of the search functionality, Symantec announced the Ask.com search box would be hidden in future releases of version 3.0.

The capability to back up files to a flash drive was introduced in this release. Files stored on a flash drive can be copied to another computer without Norton 360 installed. Norton also creates a virtual drive in Windows Explorer, allowing users to browse their backup files, stored locally or online. Users can restore individual files using the drag-and-drop technique. Version 3.0 does not retain previous versions of files and skips files which are open by another program. A startup application manager was included in this release, allowing users to control which programs start at login. To complement the application manager, Norton can measure the impact programs have on login time.

PC Magazine highlighted version 3.0's inaccurate spam filter, misfiling half of valid mail as spam. PC Magazine also noted a support session with a Symantec technician who used the shareware application Malwarebytes Anti-Malware to remove malware from a computer, referring to it as an "online Norton program". Controversy was raised over the fact the technician misleadingly referred to the program as a Symantec product.

Version 4.0 
Version 4.0 was released on February 17, 2010. This version adds many new security features found in Norton Internet Security 2010. Version 4 also features a GUI change. The prominent colors now match the gold and black sunburst of Norton Internet Security. The widely criticized antispam has been replaced with the far more effective Brightmail, which according to Symantec gives 20% better results and require no training.

Version 5.0 
Version 5.0 was released in February 2011 and offers improved performance and virus detection. It also provides updated versions of SONAR (version 3) and System insight. Download Insight now not only supports Internet Explorer and Firefox browsers only, but also supports the following clients: QQ (Chat), MSN Messenger (Chat), Limewire (P2P), MSN Explorer (Browser, E-mail & Chat), Opera (Browser), Outlook (E-mail), Thunderbird (E-mail), Windows Mail (E-mail), Chrome (Browser), BitTorrent (P2P), AOL (Browser), Yahoo Messenger (Chat), Safari (Browser), FileZilla (File Manager), Outlook Express (E-mail).

It features a new and enhanced interface with more realistic icons and animations and it also includes Norton Widgets - a platform that integrates other Symantec online services directly in the UI. Also new for this version are Reputation scan, that gives the user clear insight of the loaded applications and files and the Safeweb for Facebook, which scans the links on the wall to verify their safety. Links to Norton Recovery Tools have been added in the scanner's interface and in the start menu folder to help in restoring a highly infected system. The backup and restore functionality has also been improved. Passmark performance test 011 rated Norton 360 5.0 as the fastest and lightest all-in-one suite.

Version 6.0
Featured Metered Broadband modes, and easily remembers logins and other personal info while protecting against online identity theft.

Version-Less (unofficially 7.0 or 2013) 20.0
This version of Norton was released on September 5, 2012, together with the newest Norton AntiVirus and Norton Internet Security products. It was described as Version-Less in Symantec's press release alluding to automatic updates that always keep the software to its latest version. There is no specific version reference anywhere in the description of the software. The software is compatible with Windows 8. This version of Norton 360 features enhancements in social networking protection, anti-scam capabilities, and stronger networking defenses. Norton also introduced the extra tune up disk optimizer.

Version 21 (2014)
Version 21 of Norton's security suite was released on September 4, 2013, together with the newest Norton Antivirus and Norton Internet Security products. Norton 360 is an antivirus solution developed on SONAR technology, which claims to be able to detect any threat, block it, and remove it, thanks to three out of five layers of shields: Threat Monitoring, Threat Removal, and Network Defense, the last one dealing with online threats before they can actually reach the user’s computer. Protection is also granted through analyzing the behavior of known menaces.

Version 22 (2015)
Version 22 was released on September 22, 2014. This release was marketed as Norton Security 2015, however Norton 360 users are able to update to v22, even when Norton is retiring the Norton 360 brand. The appearance of the software is identical to Norton Security 2015, except for the product name in the top-left corner.

Norton 360 (2019) 
In April 2019, the Norton 360 brand was revived to replace Norton Security, adding Norton Secure VPN, 10 GB of online backup per-user, as well as premium plans incorporating LifeLock identity theft protection.Additional features have been added to the Norton 360 product line, including a specific suite of tools for gaming in 2021, and social media monitoring services in February 2022.Norton 360 won three categories in AV-TEST Institute's 2021 Awards, for Best Protection and Best Performance for Windows Home, MacOS security, and Android security for consumer use. In January 2022, Norton installed a cryptominer that would mine Ethereum once activated by the user; the feature was permanently disabled in September of that year.

Norton 360 Editions
Norton 360 is available as Norton 360 (standard), Norton 360 Premier Edition, and Norton 360 Multi-Device. The Premier Edition has all the functions of the standard edition, with the difference that it comes with 25 GB of online storage versus 2 GB which is included with the standard edition. Norton 360 Multi-Device is actually three products in one subscription: Norton 360 Premier Edition, Norton Internet Security for Mac®, and Norton Mobile Security. The comparison between Norton 360 editions and Norton One shows all of the features and OS coverage.
Norton 360- Gold Edition credit card type with 5 unique sets of alpha-numeric key data on reverse is sold with the instructions to go online and install on the installation page.

Norton 360 software is not sold; it is a purchased subscription for a stated period (e.g. one year). The software (e.g. firewall, antivirus) is automatically disabled at the end of the subscription period, unless a new subscription is purchased.

A special edition of Norton 360 Premier Edition, branded Norton Security Suite, used to be available for free to PC and Mac customers of Comcast Xfinity internet service until 1/1/2021. Comcast Norton Security Subscriptions ended 1/1/2021. The only difference between Norton 360 Premier Edition and Norton Security Suite is the latter does not include any online storage feature. Major version updates to Norton Security Suite typically occur about 1 month or more after Norton 360.

Mobile version 
Gen Digital Inc. released a mobile Norton 360 application in 2021 on the App Store for iOS devices, and Google Play for Android devices.

Disadvantages of older versions before 3.0

FBI cooperation
Symantec, in compliance with the FBI, whitelisted Magic Lantern, a keylogger developed by the FBI. The purpose of Magic Lantern is to obtain passwords to encrypted e-mail as part of a criminal investigation. Magic Lantern was first reported in the media by Bob Sullivan of MSNBC on November 20, 2001 and by Ted Bridis of the Associated Press. Magic Lantern is deployed as an e-mail attachment. When the attachment is opened, a trojan horse is installed on the suspect's computer. The trojan horse is activated when the suspect uses PGP encryption, often used to increase the security of sent e-mail messages. When activated, the trojan horse will log the PGP password, which allows the FBI to decrypt user communications. Symantec and other major antivirus vendors have whitelisted Magic Lantern, rendering their antivirus products, including Norton Internet Security, incapable of detecting Magic Lantern. Concerns include uncertainties about Magic Lantern's full potential and whether hackers could subvert it for purposes outside the jurisdiction of the law.

Graham Cluley, a technology consultant from Sophos, said "We have no way of knowing if it was written by the FBI, and even if we did, we wouldn’t know whether it was being used by the FBI or if it had been commandeered by a third party". Another reaction came from Marc Maiffret, chief technical officer and cofounder of eEye Digital Security, "Our customers are paying us for a service, to protect them from all forms of malicious code. It is not up to us to do law enforcement's job for them so we do not, and will not, make any exceptions for law enforcement malware or other tools."

FBI spokesman Paul Bresson, in response if Magic Lantern needed a court order to deploy, "Like all technology projects or tools deployed by the FBI it would be used pursuant to the appropriate legal process." Proponents of Magic Lantern argue the technology would allow law enforcement to efficiently and quickly decrypt messages protected by encryption schemes. Implementing Magic Lantern does not require physical access to a suspect's computer, unlike Carnivore, a predecessor to Magic Lantern, since physical access to a computer would require a court order.

Uninstallation

Norton Internet Security (Windows versions) is criticized for not uninstalling completely, leaving unnecessary files and registry entries. Versions prior to 3.0 also installed a separate LiveUpdate program, which updates Norton-branded software. The user must uninstall both Norton Internet Security and the LiveUpdate component manually. The LiveUpdate component is purposely left behind to update other Norton-branded products, if present. Symantec has developed the Norton Removal Tool to remove registry keys and values along with files and folders. The uninstaller must be run twice: initially, then again after a computer restart, requiring a second restart. Uninstallation will not remove subscription data, which is preserved to prevent users from installing multiple trial copies.

Windows Service Packs

When Norton 360 version 2.0 is installed, users have encountered incompatibilities upgrading to Windows XP Service Pack 3 or Windows Vista Service Pack 1. Users report numerous invalid Windows Registry keys being added by a tool named fixcss.exe, resulting in an empty Device Manager and missing devices such as wireless network adapters. Symantec initially blamed Microsoft for the incompatibilities but has since accepted partial responsibility.

Dave Cole, senior director of product management, acknowledged that users running Norton products were experiencing problems, but said the numbers are small. Cole also said that Symantec had done "extensive testing" of its products with Windows XP SP3, but this issue was not encountered. Cole blamed Microsoft "This is related to XP SP3." Microsoft recommended for users to contact Windows customer support. To resolve the problem, Symantec has issued a fix intended for users before upgrading. Symantec also recommends disabling the tamper protection component in the 2008 release, dubbed SymProtect. A tool to remove the added registry entries is available from Symantec.

Windows Vista

Sarah Hicks, Symantec's vice president of consumer product management, voiced concern over Windows Vista 64-bit's PatchGuard feature. PatchGuard was designed by Microsoft to ensure the integrity of the kernel, a part of an operating system which interacts with the hardware. Rootkits may hide in an operating system's kernel, complicating removal. Mike Dalton, European president of McAfee said, "The decision to build a wall around the kernel with the assumption it can't be breached is ridiculous", claiming Microsoft was preventing security vendors from effectively protecting the kernel while promoting its own security product, Windows Live OneCare. Hicks said Symantec did not mind the competition from OneCare. Symantec later published a white paper detailing PatchGuard with instructions to obtain a PatchGuard exploit. After negotiations and investigations from antitrust regulators, Microsoft decided to allow security vendors access to the kernel by creating special API instructions.

Subscription expiration 

Norton 360 comes with a one-year subscription which is activated upon installation, and is valid for three home computers. Expiration of the subscription not only blocks access to program updates but shuts down the antivirus and the firewall as well. All the other tools, such as the bundled password manager with user saved passwords are also inaccessible. Users often do not understand that they will be completely exposed, so their PCs become infected by viruses.

See also
Norton Internet Security
Norton AntiVirus

References

External links
Norton official website

Antivirus software
Firewall software
Backup software
360
Gen Digital software